Koen Beeckman (born 2 September 1973) is a Belgian former professional road cyclist. He rode in the 1999 Vuelta a España, and finished 106th overall.

Major results
1997
 4th Le Samyn
1998
 2nd Overall Circuit Franco-Belge
 3rd Omloop van het Waasland
 8th Grand Prix de Denain
1999
 3rd Nationale Sluitingprijs
 10th GP de la Ville de Villers
2001
 7th Overall Étoile de Bessèges

External links

1973 births
Living people
Belgian male cyclists
Cyclists from East Flanders
People from Wetteren